Nevada Township is a township in Story County, Iowa, USA.  As of the 2000 census, its population was 6,934.

Geography
According to the USGS, it contains three cemeteries: Nevada Cemetery, Mound Cemetery and Pleasant Run Cemetery.

 U.S. Route 30 runs east–west through the township, and County Road S27 runs north–south.

Story County maintains Hickory Grove Park, a  multiple-use recreational area located in eastern Nevada Township.  The park contains a  lake stocked with largemouth bass, bluegill, crappie, channel catfish, and grass carp.

References
 USGS Geographic Names Information System (GNIS)
 Story County Hickory Grove Park

External links
 US-Counties.com
 City-Data.com

Townships in Story County, Iowa
Townships in Iowa